The New Orleans/Utah Jazz have selected the following players in the National Basketball Association Draft.

Key

Draft selections

Notes

References

 
National Basketball Association draft
draft history